The Metal Aircraft Flamingo was a monoplane produced in Cincinnati, Ohio by the Metal Aircraft Corporation in the 1930s.

Design and development
The Metal Aircraft Corporation purchased the design from the Halpin Development Co. and unveiled it at the 1929 National Air Races with Elinor Smith. Following an accident at Bowman Field in May 1928, the prototype Flamingo was redesigned with a different nose, windscreen, and tail. The interior was insulated with Balsam-Wool Blanket.

Operational history
The Flamingo was first flown from Lunken Airport on 8 April 1928 by Thomas E. Halpin. At one point, the aircraft carried an African-American porter in a red suit named Benny Smith. Following a teaser, marketing for the new airplane began in March 1929 and dealers were being solicited by the following month.

One G-2-W, named El Rio Caroní, is best remembered for its role in the discovery of Angel Falls by Jimmy Angel in 1935. Although well known to the local indigenous population, the falls had been glimpsed only by European explorers until Jimmy Angel crash-landed while attempting to land above the falls on Auyán-tepui during gold exploration.

The Metal Aircraft Corporation Flamingo that crashed above the falls was recovered by helicopter in the 1960s by the Venezuelan government and is on display at the entrance of the Ciudad Bolívar airport, in Venezuela. A replica was put in its place for visitors of the crash site.

Other operators included the Mason & Dixon airline. Another operator of the aircraft was United States Airways which flew a route from Denver to Kansas City in the early 1930s. Stops were made Goodland, Salina, and Topeka, Kansas.

Variants

Halpin Flamingosix-passenger 410hp P&W
G-1five-passenger 450hp P&W
G-2six-passenger
G-2-Hsix-passenger 525hp P&W

G-2-Weight-passenger 410hp P&W
G-MT-6five-passenger 410 or 525 P&W

Operators

 Comet Air Express
 Embry-Riddle Division of American Airways
 Iowa Airways Corporation
 Mason & Dixon Airlines – 4 aircraft
 United States Airways
 Vermilya-Huffman Flying Service

Accidents and incidents
 On 26 May 1928, a Flamingo nosed over on landing at Bowman Field in Louisville, Kentucky, injuring the pilot, mechanic, and a passenger.
 On 8 November 1930, a G-2 operated by the Embry-Riddle Company made an emergency landing near Indianapolis following an in-flight fire.

Specifications (Flamingo G-2-W)

References

1930s United States civil utility aircraft
History of aviation
High-wing aircraft
Single-engined tractor aircraft